Scadbury may refer to:
Scadbury Park, a  park and nature reserve in Chislehurst, London Borough of Bromley, United Kingdom
Manor of Scadbury, a ruined manor in Chislehurst, London Borough of Bromley, United Kingdom